The Copper Promise is a 2013 fantasy novella series by Jen Williams and her debut work. It was initially released between December 2013 and January 2014 as a set of four e-book novellas and has since been published in paperback format as a single volume through Headline.

Plot
The story concerns the deposed Lord Frith's search for vengeance against the killers of his family. In the process, he employs the services of two mercenaries, Sebastian and Wydrin. Their actions in the early part of the story result in the release of a dragon god and an unstoppable army, and much of the subsequent narrative covers their attempts to make amends for this disaster.

Books
Ghosts of the Citadel (20 December 2013)
Children of the Fog (2 January 2014)
Prince of Wounds (16 January 2014)
Upon the Ashen Blade (30 January 2014)

Reception
Critical reception for The Copper Promise has been predominantly positive. SciFiNow praised the work as being "a gripping, fast-paced adventure that’s a must-read" with "realistically flawed characters", and the British Fantasy Society also cited the characters as one of the highlights of the work. Sfcrowsnest also gave the book a favorable review, as they appreciated that the book did not have "one of those sickening cliff-hangers at the end" and that it was "better than the average fantasy novel out there on the market."

References

2014 fantasy novels
2014 British novels
2014 debut novels
British fantasy novels
Headline Publishing Group books